PP-238 Bahawalnagar-II is a Constituency of Provincial Assembly of Punjab.

General elections 2013

General elections 2008

See also
 PP-237 Bahawalnagar-I
 PP-239 Bahawalnagar-III

References

Provincial constituencies of Punjab, Pakistan